Euselasia orfita is a species of metalmark butterfly, Riodinidae. It is found in the Guianas, Ecuador, Colombia, Bolivia, Brazil (Pará) and Peru.

References

Riodinidae
Riodinidae of South America
Lepidoptera of Brazil
Lepidoptera of Colombia
Lepidoptera of Peru
Fauna of the Amazon
Butterflies described in 1777
Taxa named by Pieter Cramer